is a Japanese anime film produced by Bandai Namco Pictures and directed by Seiji Mizushima and Shinya Watada. It premiered in Japanese theaters in December 2021.

Cast

Production and release
The film was first revealed in November 2020 as part of the "Zutto Ōen Project 2011 + 10...", which is commemorating the 10th anniversary of the 2011 Tōhoku earthquake and tsunami. It will be produced by Bandai Namco Pictures, directed by Seiji Mizushima (chief director) and Shinya Watada, and written by Reiko Yoshida. Character designs are provided by Hiroko Yaguchi, while Michiru Ōshima is composing the film's music. The film was originally scheduled to premiere in Japan in early Q3 2021. However, the film's release was delayed to December 3, 2021. It was exhibited in the Japanese Animation section at the 34th Tokyo International Film Festival, which was held from October 30 to November 8, 2021, and was pre-screened on November 6.

Manga adaptation
A manga adaptation, written and illustrated by Mine Shito, was serialized in Media Factory's Monthly Comic Alive from January 27 to October 27, 2021. It was compiled in two tankōbon volumes, which were both released on November 22 of the same year.

Notes

References

External links
Official website 

2020s coming-of-age films
2021 anime films
2021 films
2021 manga
Anime with original screenplays
Aniplex
Bandai Namco Pictures
Films set in Fukushima Prefecture
Hula
Japanese animated feature films
Japanese coming-of-age films
2020s Japanese-language films
Media Factory manga
Seinen manga